The black-bordered emo skink or Vanuatu silver vineskink (Emoia nigromarginata) is a species of lizard in the family Scincidae. It is found in Vanuatu.

References

Emoia
Reptiles described in 1913
Taxa named by Jean Roux